Col de Pierre Pertuis (el. 827 m.) is a mountain pass in the Jura Mountains in the canton of Bern in Switzerland.

It connects Sonceboz and Tavannes.

The name of the pass comes from the Latin: Petra pertusa, meaning broken rock.   The pass road has been dated to the second half of the 1st century AD.  A  large inscription on the north side of the road lists Marcus Dunius Paternus, the duumvir of the Helvetii Colony Aventicum, as the builder of the road.  This inscription honors the emperor and dates to around 200 AD. It probably refers to the renovation and expansion of the existing road and the widening of the rocky gate leading into the pass.

The pass road connected the Aventicum (modern Avenches)-Salodurum (modern Solothurn)-Augusta Raurica road with the Vesontio (modern Besançon)-Epomanduodurum (modern Mandeure)-Kembs road.

The pass was first mentioned in a record from 1179 as the boundary between the dioceses of Lausanne and Basel.  It remained the border between the powerful bishops until the Protestant Reformation.

The first modern road was built in 1752 by the Abbot of Moutier-Grandval Abbey and the Vogt of Erguel.  This road linked the cities of Basel and Biel.  After the 1797 French victory and the Treaty of Campo Formio, the pass became part of France.  After Napoleon's defeat and the Congress of Vienna, the pass and the surrounding area were assigned to the Canton of Bern in 1815.  Bern widened part of the pass road in a section between Bözingen (now part of Biel) and Courtelary.

In 1874 a railway tunnel was completed through the pass which linked Sonceboz and Tavannes. The tunnel is now part of the Sonceboz-Sombeval–Moutier railway.

The first road that was passable for automobiles was built during World War I by the corps of engineers of the Swiss Army. In 1932, a new road was built employing the jobless due to the Great Depression. In November 1997, a 2100-meter-long tunnel was opened for the A-16 Autobahn.

References

Pierre Pertuis
Pierre Pertuis
Mountain passes of the canton of Bern